The 2017 Kjærgaard Danish FIM Speedway Grand Prix was the fifth race of the 2017 Speedway Grand Prix season. It took place on June 24 at the CASA Arena in Horsens, Denmark.

Riders 
First reserve Peter Kildemand replaced Nicki Pedersen, who was injured and not fit to race. The Speedway Grand Prix Commission also nominated Kenneth Bjerre as the wild card, and Andreas Lyager and Frederik Jakobsen both as Track Reserves.

Results 
The Grand Prix was won by Poland's Maciej Janowski, who beat Emil Sayfutdinov and Patryk Dudek in the final. Jason Doyle had initially top scored during the qualifying heats, however he finished last in the final despite his broken foot. It was second successive Horsens win for Janowski, and it lifted him to third in the overall standings - seven points behind joint leaders Doyle and Dudek.

Heat details

Intermediate classification

References

See also 
 Motorcycle speedway

Denmark
Speedway Grand Prix
Horsens Municipality
2017 in Danish motorsport
Speedway Grand Prix of Denmark